Unistellar is a French manufacturer of  computer-connected telescopes that allow non-professional skywatchers to observe astronomical objects at relatively low cost.  The Enhanced Vision Telescope (eVscope) takes advantage of digital astrophotographic techniques developed by professional astronomers over the previous two decades. SETI Institute has partnered with Unistellar and will be able to send requests for information and notifications to users, and receive information about transient astronomical events.

The telescope is a -diameter Prime focus reflector, focal length 450 mm. It projects its image onto a  CMOS color sensor with 1.3 million pixels. The image is transmitted to a small screen in an eyepiece also mounted on the telescope. An electronic connection to a computer (smartphone, pad, or laptop) is required to make astronomical observations from the telescope. The digital technology allows multiple images to be stacked while subtracting the noise component of the observation producing images of Messier objects and faint stars as dim as an apparent magnitude of 15 with consumer-grade equipment.

History 

The company was founded in Marseille, France, in 2015, with incubator investment from Incubateur Impulse and Pépinières d'Entreprises Innovantes with subsequent VC round capital from private investors and a VC firm named Brighteye Ventures.  Unistellar unveiled their electronic telescope technology prototype in 2017 at CES2017 in Las Vegas and at IFA Next in Berlin.

The company experienced difficulties bringing the product to market. The consumer-grade electronic telescope was originally planned to be available in the "fall 2018" which subsequently shifted to "early 2019," then later in 2019.

By January 2020, the telescope was expected to be shipped worldwide between May and August 2020. As of December 2021, over 5000 telescopes had been delivered to customers 
The kit included a custom tripod and mount, a Bahtinov mask and a protective cap. Later, Unistellar introduced two new telescopes, eVscope 2 with bigger FOV and better monitor which won the T3 Platinum Award, and eQuinox with longer battery life and no monitor.

Science 
As presented in AGU 2021 Fall Meeting the eVscope had achieved many significant observations up to December 2021, including the detection by 79 observers of 85 transits by Jupiter-sized exoplanets, 281 asteroid occultations (including forty-five positive ones), and three shape and spin solutions for near-Earth asteroids. The network has also lent important support to NASA's TESS mission by making transatlantic observations of an exoplanet transit, and to NASA's Lucy mission by profiling Trojan asteroids this spacecraft will soon visit. These data are collected by observers in Europe, North America, Japan, Australia, and New Zealand, and the Unistellar network will expand to the rest of Asia and to South America, ensuring that each of these accomplishments is the product of coordinated efforts by hundreds or even thousands of observers across the globe.

Competitive offerings 
The Stellina astrophotography telescope by Vaonis is a similar technology-facilitated telescope that uses a digital display in lieu of an eyepiece and stacks images to get high-resolution images of deep-sky objects.

See also 
 Digiscoping

References 

Telescope manufacturers
French companies established in 2015
Telescopes